The Italian cruiser San Marco was a  armoured cruiser built for the Royal Italian Navy (Regia Marina) in the first decade of the 20th century. She was the first large Italian ship fitted with steam turbines and the first turbine-powered ship in any navy to have four propeller shafts. The ship participated in the Italo-Turkish War of 1911–1912, during which time she supported the occupations of Benghazi and Derna, the island of Rhodes, and bombarded the fortifications defending the entrance to the Dardanelles. During World War I, San Marcos activities were limited by the threat of Austro-Hungarian submarines, although the ship did participate in the bombardment of Durazzo, Albania in late 1918. She played a minor role in the Corfu incident in 1923 and was converted into a target ship in the first half of the 1930s. San Marco was captured by the Germans when they occupied northern Italy in 1943 and was found sunk at the end of the war. The ship was broken up and scrapped in 1949.

Design and description
The ships of the San Giorgio class were designed as improved versions of the Pisa-class design. San Marcos design featured several new innovations that differentiated her from her sister ship San Giorgio. San Marco was given the first steam turbines fitted in a large Italian ship and she was the first turbine-powered ship in any navy to have four shafts, the first with a gyroscopic compass, the first with antiroll tanks, and the first not to use wood in any way.

Her complement was 32 officers and 666 to 673 enlisted men.

The ship was powered by four steam turbines, each driving one propeller shaft using steam supplied by 14 Babcock & Wilcox boilers. The ship was also required to be a half a knot faster than San Giorgio, a requirement she easily surpassed.

The main armament of the San Giorgio-class ships consisted of four Cannone da 254/45 A Modello 1908 guns in twin-gun turrets fore and aft of the superstructure. The ships mounted eight Cannone da 190/45 A Modello 1908 in four twin-gun turrets, two in each side amidships, as their secondary armament. For defense against torpedo boats, they carried 18 quick-firing (QF) 40-caliber  guns. Eight of these were mounted in embrasures in the sides of the hull and the rest in the superstructure. The ships were also fitted with a pair of 40-caliber QF  guns. The San Giorgios were also equipped with three submerged  torpedo tubes. During World War I, eight of the 76 mm guns were replaced by six 76 mm anti-aircraft guns and one torpedo tube was removed.

The 254 mm gun turrets were protected by 200 mm of armour while the 190 mm turrets had .

Construction and career
San Marco , named after Saint Mark, the patron saint of Venice, was ordered on 18 September 1905 and laid down on 2 January 1907 at the Regio Cantieri di Castellammare di Stabia in Castellammare di Stabia, on the Bay of Naples. The ship was launched on 20 December 1907 and completed on 7 February 1911.

When the Italo-Turkish War of 1911–1912 began on 29 September 1911, San Marco was not initially assigned to the 2nd Division of the 1st Squadron of the Mediterranean Fleet. After negotiations for a surrender of the town fell apart, Pisa shelled the barracks and a fort. There was no return fire from Derna, so a boat with offers of a truce was sent in. When it was greeted by a volley of rifle fire, San Marco and the other armoured cruisers opened fire on the town with their 190 mm guns and, according to a contemporary account, "completely destroyed" the town in 30 minutes time. A landing party was unable to reach the shore because of rough seas and gunfire from the shore. San Marco and her consorts then shelled the beach for two hours. Weather conditions prevented a landing until the 18th, when 1,500 men took possession of Derna. The ship then supported Italian troops at Benghazi in December. In mid-April 1912 the Italian fleet sortied into the eastern Aegean Sea with Pisa and Amalfi leading in an attempt to lure out the Ottoman fleet. When that failed, the Italians bombarded the fortifications defending the Dardanelles to little effect before the main body departed for Italy on the 19th. In May San Marco provided support for the occupation of Rhodes and finally returned home on 20 September.

She was used for experiments evaluating shipboard operation of seaplanes before the start of World War I. The ship was based at Brindisi when Italy declared war on the Central Powers on 23 May 1915. That night, the Austro-Hungarian Navy bombarded the Italian coast in an attempt to disrupt the Italian mobilization. Of the many targets, Ancona was hardest hit, with disruptions to the town's gas, electric, and telephone service; the city's stockpiles of coal and oil were left in flames. All of the Austrian ships safely returned to port, putting pressure on the Regia Marina to stop the attacks. When the Austrians resumed bombardments on the Italian coast in mid-June, Admiral Paolo Thaon di Revel responded by sending San Marco and the other armoured cruisers at Brindisi—the navy's newest—to Venice to supplement the older ships already there. Shortly after their arrival at Venice, Amalfi was sunk by a submarine on 7 July and her loss severely restricted the activities of the other ships based at Venice. San Marco later participated in the bombardment of Durazzo (now known as Durrës) on 2 October 1918 which sank one merchantman and damaged two others.

On 21 September 1923, the ship transported to Taranto the bodies of the members of the Boundary Commission killed on Corfu on 27 August (their deaths sparked the Corfu incident). On 1 October, San Marco ferried the last occupation troops from Corfu to Brindisi. On 16 March 1924, she saluted King Victor Emmanuel III when he arrived in Fiume to attend the ceremony commemorating the city's annexation by Italy. San Marco escorted Crown Prince Umberto, travelling aboard San Giorgio, during his South American tour in July–September 1924.

San Marco was disarmed and converted into a radio-controlled (by the elderly destroyer ) target ship in 1931–1935. She was captured by the Germans when they occupied La Spezia on 9 September 1943; the ship was found at the end of the war sunk in the harbor there. San Marco was formally stricken from the Navy List on 27 February 1947 and broken up in 1949.

Notes

Bibliography

External links
 San Marco (1908) Marina Militare website

San Giorgio-class cruisers
Ships built in Castellammare di Stabia
1907 ships
World War I cruisers of Italy
Naval ships of Italy captured by Germany during World War II